SmartGeometry (SG) is a non-profit organization focusing on the use of the computer as an intelligent design aid in architecture, engineering and construction (AEC). It encourages collaboration between practicing AEC professionals, academics and students using computational and parametric software tools.

Group information and activities
The group is led by Lars Hesselgren of KPF, Hugh Whitehead of Foster + Partners and J. Parrish of Arup Sport.

SG hosts annual workshops and conferences on the use of advanced modeling tools and new design methodologies in architecture. Participants come from architectural and engineering practices.

GenerativeComponents is a commercial software product by Bentley Systems, brought to the market after a testing cycle by a user community with SG members in its core.

See also
 Architecture
 Architectural engineering
 Design computing
 Comparison of CAD Software
 GenerativeComponents

References

External links
SmartGeometry Official Website
SmartGeometry Conferences Website
GenerativeComponents Website
Design Architecture Services

Building engineering organizations
Computer-aided design software
Data modeling
Architecture organizations